The Harris Super Quarry was a super quarry at Lingerbay, Harris, Scotland proposed by Redland Aggregates in 1991.  The plan was to surface mine aggregate.

References

Harris, Outer Hebrides
Public inquiries in Scotland
Quarries in Scotland
Mining in Scotland